The Mausoleum of Kara Koyunlu emirs or Mausoleum of Turkmen emirs also known as Emir Pir-Hussein Mausoleum, is a Turcoman mausoleum erected in 1413 and located in the village of Argavand, Ararat Province, on the outskirts of the Armenian capital Yerevan.

The mausoleum acts as the tomb of Emir Saad, the chieftain of the Turkic Saadlu tribe, who had accompanied Timur from Central Asia.

History
The tomb was restored and ceremonially reopened to the public in 2002.

In December 2012, during the high-level meeting between Armenia and Turkmenistan, it was proposed to jointly restore the monument and its dome. In June 2013, a project of restoration of the mausoleum was presented, and in February, 2015, the reconstruction and repair of the mausoleum by an Armenian construction company began on the order of the Ministry of Culture of Armenia. There is an agreement between the Ministry of Education, Science, Culture and Sports of Armenia and the Ministry of Culture of Turkmenistan. Turkmenistan, on her part, will repair the Armenian church on the territory of Turkmenistan.

J. Buchan Telfer, Captain in the Royal Navy and Fellow of the Society of Antiquaries, wrote in his 1876 book: "Near the hamlet of Djafarabad is a circular brick erection like a tower, said to be the remains of a monument raised by the Persians to commemorate a victory."

Architecture

The Kara Koyunlu mausoleum has a decagonal plan. Each of the monument's façades extend from the base of the tower until midway up the dome. Architecturally, it is divided into three sections; a lower section with an entrance, a middle section with two windows and decorative elements, and an upper section consisting a dome. The main body of the tower is constructed of tuff stone, while brick was used as the underlying material for the construction of the dome.

Decorative elements include a blue and turquoise glazed ceramic tile trim that is still visible along the upper portion of the tower, just below the base of the dome and above an inscription. Below the tile trim is some decorative molding, while a frieze in bas-relief encircles the top portion of the funerary tower is inscribed in Arabic and begins with a famous sura from the Quran. It then goes on to commemorate Emir Pir-Hussein, the son of Sa'ad.  The inscription says:

In the name of Allah gracious and merciful! Allah... there is no god besides Him, alive (or) real. Neither drowsiness nor sleep can seize Him. He owns everything in the heavens and on the earth. Who will plead, except with His permission? He knows what was before them and what will be after them, while they perceive nothing from His knowledge other than He wishes. His throne embraces the heavens and the earth, and He is not burdened by guarding them. Indeed great and high is He. Ordered to build this blessed tomb (kubba) the greatest, the noblest, abundant in generosity and magnanimity, the support of kings and sultans, refuge for the weak and the poor, guardian of scientists and those who seek knowledge, aid to the poor and wayfarers, the glory of the state and the faith, Emir Pir-Hussein, son of the late absolved Emir elevated to His patronage, the most merciful Emir Sa’ad… may the earth lie light upon him… in the days of the reign of the Great Sultan, the most generous Khaqan, the Sultan of Sultans in the East and the West, the aid of the state and the faith, Pir Budaq Khan and Yusef Noyän… may Allah perpetuate their power, on the fifteenth of Rajab of the year 816 (11 October 1413).

There is a single entrance into the mausoleum's interior. Two small rectangular windows are located in the north and south façades, centered between the upper and lower portions of the tower.

Gallery

References

External links 

Tourist attractions in Yerevan
Buildings and structures in Yerevan
Mausoleums in Armenia
Monuments and memorials in Armenia
Kara Koyunlu
Decagonal buildings
Islamic architecture